, known professionally as Cocomi, is a Japanese model and flutist.

Personal life 
Cocomi Kimura was born on May 1, 2001 in Tokyo, Japan. She is the eldest daughter to actor Takuya Kimura and singer Shizuka Kudo. Her younger sister, Kōki, is a model and songwriter. She can speak in Japanese, French, and English. She can speak fluent English since she was a child, having attended international schools (Aoba Japan International School and British School, Tokyo Showa). She learned to play violin and piano at the age of three and started to learn how to play the flute since the age of eleven. She studied under Kanda Hiroaki, a professor at Toho Gakuen School of Music and principal flutist of the NHK Symphony Orchestra. She completed a masterclass under the tutelage of Vladimir Ashkenazy and Emmanuel Pahud.

She won in the Wind Instrument High School Division during the 2nd Japan Music Competition in Tokyo, though she was not able to make it to the national competition.

In March 2020, she graduated from Toho Girls' High School, Department of Music.

Career 
In March 2020, Cocomi debuted as a model, appearing as a cover girl in the May 2020 issue of Vogue Japan. She is also chosen as an ambassador for Dior.

Filmography

Film

Awards and accolades

References

External links 
 

2001 births
Japanese female models
Living people